Threads of Time (살례탑) is a historical fantasy manhwa series, set in the era of the Mongol invasions of Korea, written and illustrated by Mi-young Noh. It was originally published by Daiwon C.I. in South Korea, and was serialized in its Monthly Junior Champ magazine. The series was distributed in English by Tokyopop in North America.

Plot
High school student Moon Bin Kim has difficulty sleeping due to a recurring nightmare where he's stranded over a thousand years in the past chasing a dark-haired girl into a deep abyss.

Before long, the nightmare overwhelms him, and he is unable to tell whether he is Moon Bin, a Seoul teenager at the end of the second Millennium, or Sa Kyung Kim, the son of a prominent warrior family in the middle of the first Millennium. People in his present-day life assume roles in his historical life as he struggles to learn exactly who he is and what he's expected to do, straddling a transmigratory portal through time and space.

In the present, his school's kumdo club battles to stay in the championships but in the past, Moon Bin finds himself at the threshold of a territorial dispute on the plains of Mongolia.

Characters
Moon Bin Kim (Sa Kyung Kim) - A student living on his own who suffers an accident and enters a coma in which his soul is sent back in time. Throughout his adventures, he discovers that he was Sali Tayi in a former life and was dragged back in time by the souls of the family of his current body, whom Sali Tayi killed. He realizes that he must kill Sali Tayi and himself to end this ordeal. It is also revealed to him that he "took over" Sa Kyung's body when Sa Kyung died during his comatose state.

Atan Hadas (Euen Eun Kyo) - A granddaughter of Genghis Khan, who acts as a love interest for both Moon Bin Kim, who she loves, and Sali Tayi, to whom she is betrothed. As a woman, she was unable to take a position as a warrior, but by disguising herself as a man and winning a competition, she was able to take the position of a commander at Sali Tayi's side. She's level-headed and smart, knowing that there are those on the battlefield who do not want her there and working to combat it by making herself an essential source of information.

Sali Tayi - A ruthless Mongol general who was sent to conquer Koryo (Korea). Engaged to Atan Hadas. He's known for his vicious nature on the battlefield.

Yeon Young (Chung War) - A servant of Sa Kyung Kim who was enslaved and sold in Mongol territory.

Sa Lum - Sa Kyung's older sister. She is the one that pulled Moon Bin underwater in the pool, and therefore responsible for his trip to the past. Ultimately raped and killed by Sali Tayi. Before her death, her body was in a comatose state, yet her spirit - both while she was living and dead - often visited Moon Bin.

Ma Zhang Bo - A servant of Sa Kyung that died in while hiding from the Mongols

Kim Kyung Sohn - A renowned Korean General and Sa Kyung's father, ultimately killed by Sali Tayi.

Ogodei Deh-Khan - The leader of the Mongols.

Media

North American releases

References

External links
 Tokyopop page on Threads of Time
 

Action-adventure comics
Fantasy comics
Historical comics
Manhwa titles
Tokyopop titles
1999 comics debuts
Comics set in the 13th century